This Time It's Love may refer to:
 This Time It's Love (Kurt Elling album)
 This Time It's Love (The Hi-Lo's album)